Alexander Romanov may refer to:

Alexander I of Russia (1777–1825), also known as Alexander the Blessed
Alexander II of Russia (1818–1881), aka Alexander the Liberator
Alexander III of Russia (1845–1894)
Alexander Romanov (ice hockey, born 1980) (born 1980),  Russian ice hockey player in the Kontinental Hockey League
Alexander Romanov (ice hockey, born 2000)
Alexandr Romanov (fighter), Moldavian mixed martial artist
Grand Duke Alexander Alexandrovich of Russia (1869–1870), infant son of Alexander III
Grand Duke Alexander Mikhailovich of Russia (1866–1933), dynast of the Russian Empire, naval officer, author, explorer & brother-in-law of Emperor Nicholas II
Grand Duke Alexander Vladimirovich of Russia
Prince Alexander Romanov (1929–2002), Russian prince and descendant of the Imperial Family